The Department of Defense Civil Disturbance Plan, also known by its cryptonym GARDEN PLOT, was a general US Army and National Guard plan to respond to major domestic civil disturbances within the United States. The plan was developed in response to the civil disorders of the 1960s and fell under the control of the U.S. Northern Command (NORTHCOM). It provided Federal military and law enforcement assistance to local governments during times of major civil disturbances.

The Garden Plot plan—drafted after the Watts, Newark, and Detroit riots—captures the acrimonious times when the document was drawn up. The "Plot" warns against "racial unrest," as well as "anti-draft" and "anti-Vietnam" elements."

The Pentagon activated Garden Plot to restore order during the 1992 Los Angeles Riots. Garden Plot was superseded by USNORTHCOM Concept Plan (CONPLAN) 2502 following the September 11, 2001 attacks on the United States.  Under Homeland Security restructuring, it has been suggested that similar models be followed.

See also
 Huston Plan
 National Security and Homeland Security Presidential Directive
 Posse Comitatus Act
 Rex 84
 United States color-coded war plans

References

External links
 http://www.globalsecurity.org/military/ops/garden_plot.htm
 Document Friday: “Garden Plot:” The Army’s Emergency Plan to Restore “Law and Order” to America, National Security Archive
 , National Security Archive

Garden Plot
Civil detention in the United States
United States military policies
Military intelligence